Eucalyptus pauciflora subsp. niphophila, commonly known as snow gum, is a small tree or large shrub that is native to a few mountain peaks in eastern Australia. It has smooth bark, glossy green, lance-shaped to egg-shaped or elliptical leaves, flower buds in groups of between nine and fifteen, white flowers and cup-shaped, hemispherical or conical fruit. It differs from other subspecies of E. pauciflora in having more delicate, pedicellate flower buds and smaller leaves.

Description
The bark is smooth, grey, white or cream-coloured with patches of yellow and pink, and the branchlets are glaucous. Flowering has been recorded between December and February and the flowers are white. Subspecies niphophila differs from others in the species in having more delicate, pedicellate flower buds, small leaves and glaucous branchlets, buds and fruit.

Taxonomy and naming
Eucalyptus niphophila was first formally described in 1929 by Joseph Maiden and William Blakely in Maiden's book A Critical Revision of the Genus Eucalyptus, from material collected near "Pretty Point" on Mount Kosciuszko. In 1973, Lawrie Johnson and Donald Blaxell reduced the species to a subspecies of E. pauciflora as E. pauciflora subsp. niphophila. The epithet (niphophila) is derived from ancient Greek meaning "snow-loving", referring to the alpine habitat of this eucalypt.

Distribution and habitat
This subspecies occurs on the highest peaks suitable for tree growth in the Snowy Mountains, including in the Kosciuszko National Park, extending to Bimberi Peak in the Australian Capital Territory and the highest peaks in Victoria, including Mount Hotham, Mount Bogong, Mount Torbreck and Mount Wellington.

References

pauciflora
Flora of Victoria (Australia)
Plants described in 1929
Flora of New South Wales
Flora of the Australian Capital Territory